The Great Western Main Line (GWML) is a main line railway in England that runs westwards from London Paddington to . It connects to other main lines such as those from Reading to Penzance and Swindon to Swansea. Opened in 1841, it was the original route of the first Great Western Railway which was merged into the Western Region of British Railways in 1948. It is now a part of the national rail system managed by Network Rail with the majority of passenger services provided by the current Great Western Railway franchise.

The line is electrified between London Paddington and Royal Wootton Bassett. Work to complete electrification all the way to Bristol was begun in 2011, but in 2016 the UK government deferred electrification of the section through Bath from Royal Wootton Bassett to Bristol, with no date set for completion, because costs had tripled.

History

The line was built by the Great Western Railway and engineered by Isambard Kingdom Brunel as a dual track line using a wider  broad gauge and was opened in stages between 1838 and 1841. The final section, between Chippenham and Bath, was opened on completion of the Box Tunnel in June 1841.

The alignment was so level and straight it was nicknamed "Brunel's billiard table". It was supplemented with a third rail for dual gauge operation, allowing standard gauge  trains to also operate on the route, in stages between 1854 and 1875. The broad gauge remained in use until 1892. Evidence of the original broad gauge can still be seen at many places where bridges are a bit wider than usual, or where tracks are ten feet apart instead of the usual six.

Following the Slough rail accident of 1900, in which five passengers were killed, improved vacuum braking systems were used on locomotives and passenger rolling stock and Automatic Train Control (ATC) was introduced in 1908.

Further widenings of the line took place between 1903 and 1910 and more widening work took place between 1931 and 1932.

At the outbreak of World War I in 1914, the Great Western Railway was taken into government control, as were most major railways in Britain. The companies were reorganised after the war into the "big four" companies, of which the Great Western Railway was one. The railways returned to direct government control during World War II before being nationalised to form British Railways (BR) in 1948.

The line speed was upgraded in the 1970s to support the introduction of the InterCity 125 high speed train (HST).

In 1977, the Parliamentary Select Committee on Nationalised Industries recommended considering electrification of more of Britain's rail network, and by 1979 BR presented a range of options that included electrifying the line from Paddington to Swansea by 2000. Under the 1979–90 Conservative governments that succeeded the 1976–79 Labour government, the proposal was not implemented.

In the mid 1990s, the line between London Paddington and Hayes & Harlington was electrified as part of the Heathrow Express project.

Partial electrification by 2019 allowed replacement of InterCity 125 and  sets by new Hitachi Super Express high speed trains – the s and s. It also allowed the introduction of  EMUs by GWR on shorter-distance services.

Heritage
The route of the GWML includes dozens of listed buildings and structures, including tunnel portals, bridges and viaducts, stations, and associated hotels. Part of the route passes through and contributes to the Georgian Architecture of the City of Bath World Heritage Site; the path through Sydney Gardens has been described as a "piece of deliberate railway theatre by Brunel without parallel". Grade I listed structures on the line include London Paddington, Wharncliffe Viaduct, the 1839 Tudor gothic River Avon Bridge in Bristol, and Bristol Temple Meads station.

Route
Communities served by the Great Western Main Line include West London (including Acton, Ealing, Hanwell, Southall, Hayes, Harlington and West Drayton); Iver; Langley; Slough; Burnham; Taplow; Maidenhead; Twyford; Reading; Tilehurst; Pangbourne; Goring-on-Thames; Streatley; Cholsey; Didcot; Swindon; Chippenham; Bath; Keynsham; and Bristol.

From London to Didcot, the line follows the Thames Valley, crossing the River Thames three times, including on the Maidenhead Railway Bridge. Between Chippenham and Bath the line passes through Box Tunnel, and then follows the valley of the River Avon.

A junction west of Swindon allows trains to reach Bristol by an alternative route along the South Wales Main Line. Other diversionary routes exist between Chippenham and Bath via the Wessex Main Line, although this involves a reversal at Bradford Junction; and from Reading to Bath via the Berks and Hants Line.

Services
Most services are provided by Great Western Railway (GWR). Some trains between London and Bristol do not call at Didcot Parkway.

The Elizabeth line runs on the Great Western Main Line between London and Reading.

Fast trains from Paddington to London Heathrow Airport are operated by Heathrow Airport Holdings as the Heathrow Express.

CrossCountry operate trains between Reading and Oxford, using the Great Western Main Line as far as Didcot and South Western Railway operate a limited number of trains between Bath and Bristol.

Great Western Railway also operate a train between London Paddington – Cardiff Central every 30 minutes, with hourly extensions to Swansea. At Swansea/Cardiff there is a connecting Transport for Wales boat train to/from Fishguard Harbour for the Stena Line ferry to Rosslare Europort in Ireland. An integrated timetable is offered between London Paddington and Rosslare Europort with through ticketing available. Daytime and nocturnal journeys are offered in both directions daily (including Sundays). Additionally, 2–3 Great Western Railway trains continue to Pembroke Dock on weekends during the Summer season to connect with ferry services to Ireland.

Infrastructure

Between London and Didcot there are four tracks, two for each direction. The main lines are mostly used by the faster trains and are on the south side of the route. The relief lines on the north side are used for slower services and those that call at all stations, as only London Paddington, Slough, Maidenhead, Twyford, Reading and Didcot Parkway stations have platforms on the main lines (although a few others have main line platforms that can be used in an emergency). Between Didcot and Royal Wootton Bassett, a series of passing loops allow fast trains to overtake slower ones. This section is signalled for bi-directional running on each line but this facility is usually only used during engineering working or when there is significant disruption to traffic in one direction.

The line is electrified between Paddington and Langley Burrell (just east of Chippenham) using  overhead supply lines; the Reading to Taunton line (as far as Newbury) and the South Wales Main Line (as far as Cardiff Central) are also electrified.

Lower restrictions apply at various locations. The line is one of two Network Rail-owned lines equipped with the Automatic Train Protection (ATP) system, the other being the Chiltern Main Line.

Tunnels, viaducts and major bridges 
Major civil engineering structures on the Great Western Main Line include the following.

Line-side monitoring equipment 
Line-side train monitoring equipment includes hot axle box detectors (HABD) and 'Wheelchex' wheel impact load detectors (WILD), sited as follows.

Recent developments

Since 2011, the Great Western has been undergoing a £5billion modernisation by Network Rail.

Reading railway station saw a major redevelopment with new platforms, a new entrance, footbridge and lifts; the work was completed a year ahead of schedule in July 2014.

Electrification
The Crossrail project covered electrification of the line from Airport Junction to Maidenhead and, following a number of announcements and delays, the government announced in March 2011 that it would electrify the line as far as Bristol Temple Meads.

Electrification of other lines, including Bristol Parkway to Temple Meads and Didcot to Oxford, was also postponed indefinitely. The government argued that bi-mode trains would fill in the gaps pending completion of electrification, although the Class 800 trains are slower in diesel mode than under electric power. Electrification as far as Didcot Parkway was completed in December 2017, and to Thingley Junction in December 2019.

Other proposals

Network Rail plans to install European Rail Traffic Management System (ERTMS) in-cab signalling on the Great Western line; this is a pre-requisite for the Super Express trains to run at 140mph (225km/h). Some or all of the resignalling work will be undertaken during the electrification work.

Further capacity improvements are also scheduled at Swindon, adding to recent changes and the new Platform 4.

Crossrail services are planned to terminate at Reading. Some of the current suburban services into London Paddington are planned to be transferred to the new Crossrail service, which will free up some surface-level capacity at Paddington.

Other more distant aspirations include resignalling and capacity improvements at Reading; the provision of four continuous tracks between Didcot and Swindon (including a grade-separated junction at Milton, where the westbound relief line switches from the north side of the line to the south); and resignalling between Bath and Bristol to enable trains to run closer together.

Access to Heathrow Airport from the west remains an aspiration and the 2009 Heathrow Airtrack scheme, abandoned in 2011, proposed a route south of the Great Western Main Line to link the airport with Reading. Plans for electrification of the line will make it easier to access Heathrow from Reading, since lack of electrification between Reading station and Airport Junction (near West Drayton station) was a limiting factor. Plans under consideration in 2014 included new tunnels between Heathrow and Langley.

Network Rail intends to replace the ATP system with ETCS – Level 2 from 2017 to 2035 along with the introduction of the new IEP trains.

Calls for station reopenings
There are calls for the reintroduction of Corsham station due to recent growth of the town. The original station was closed to passengers in 1965.

A local group is campaigning for the reopening of Saltford station between Bath and Bristol, to coincide with electrification.

There have also been calls to reopen the former Wantage Road station. Oxfordshire County Council included a proposal for a new station to serve Wantage and Grove in their 2015–2031 local transport plan.

Major incidents
Slough rail accident – 16 June 1900 – An express train from Paddington to  ran through two sets of signals at danger and collided with a local train heading for Windsor. Five passengers were killed and 35 seriously injured.
Ealing rail crash – 19 December 1973 – A train from Paddington to Oxford derailed after a loose battery box cover on the Class 52 "Western" locomotive hauling the train struck lineside equipment, causing a set of points to move under the train. Ten passengers were killed and 94 injured.
Seven people were killed and 139 were injured. The incident severely damaged public confidence in the safety of the rail system. It was found that the train's automatic warning system (AWS) was faulty, and the driver had been distracted (he had bent down to pack his bag). Great Western Trains was fined £1.5million for violations of health and safety law in connection with the accident.
 Ladbroke Grove rail crash – 5 October 1999 – A Thames Trains service from Paddington to  passed a signal at danger at the gantry protecting a main set of (crossover) points between the one-way and bi-directionally used lines. Thames Trains was fined £2million for violations of health and safety law. Railtrack pleaded guilty to charges under the Health and Safety at Work Act 1974 in relation to the accident. It was subsequently fined £4million and was also ordered to pay £225,000 in costs.

Rolling stock

Commuter trains

High speed trains

Sleeper trains

Notes
The reference for the route map diagram is:-

See also
 East Coast Main Line
 West Coast Main Line
 Midland Main Line
 Highland Main Line

References

Sources

Further reading

External links 

 
Rail transport in Berkshire
Rail transport in Bristol
Rail transport in Buckinghamshire
Rail transport in Oxfordshire
Rail transport in Wiltshire
Railway operators in London
Transport in the London Borough of Ealing
Transport in the London Borough of Hammersmith and Fulham
Transport in the London Borough of Hillingdon
Transport in the Royal Borough of Kensington and Chelsea
Transport in the City of Westminster
Railway lines opened in 1840
Railway lines in London
Railway lines in South East England
Railway lines in South West England
Main inter-regional railway lines in Great Britain
Standard gauge railways in England